Kimble may refer to:

Places in the United States
Russell Springs, Kentucky, known as "Kimble" from 1855 until 1901
Kimble, Missouri, an unincorporated community
Kimble County, Texas

People and fictional characters
Kimble (name), a list of people and fictional characters with the surname or given name
Kim Dotcom (born 1974), German-Finnish Internet entrepreneur and political activist also known as "Kimble"

Other uses
Kimble (board game), Finnish version of the board game Trouble
Kimble v. Marvel Entertainment, LLC, Supreme Court decision on patent misuse
Kimble (app), a cloud-based PSA software application
Kimble Chase, an American laboratory equipment manufacturer

See also
Kimball (disambiguation)
Great and Little Kimble, village in England